There were two major earthquakes in 2003 in Miyagi Prefecture, Japan. The first quake in May injured 174 and caused $97.3 million in damages. Another quake in July injured 677. More than 11,000 buildings were affected, causing an estimated $195.4 million in damages.

May earthquake 
The May 2003 Miyagi earthquake is an earthquake struck the east coast of the Japanese island of Honshū at 18.24 pm (09:46 UTC) on May 26. The event registered 7.1 on the Japan Meteorological Agency magnitude scale. The quake injured 174 people and caused $97.3 million in damages.

July earthquake 
The July 2003 Miyagi earthquake is a series of earthquakes that occurred in Miyagi Prefecture, Japan on July 26. The seismic magnitude scale of the mainshock was 6.4. Six hundred and seventy-seven people were injured by the earthquakes.

See also 
 List of earthquakes in 2003
 List of earthquakes in Japan
 1978 Miyagi earthquake
 2011 Tohoku earthquake and tsunami

References 

2003 earthquakes
May 2003 events in Japan
July 2003 events in Japan
2003 in Japan